Cowra is a wine region and Australian Geographical Indication in the Central Ranges zone in the Australian state of New South Wales. It is named for the town of Cowra.

Cowra is the southernmost, lowest altitude and warmest of the three regions in the Central Ranges zone. Vineyards began to be planted from 1973, and are predominantly irrigated white wine grapes. The region has a number of specialist organic and sustainable agriculture vineyards.

Wineries
The first vineyards were planted in the 1970s and were predominantly chardonnay. Since this time, a range of varieties including Sangiovese, Mourvedre and Tempranillo have had success.

References

Wine regions of New South Wales
Cowra